Béla Pálfi (16 February 1923 – 9 September 1995) was a Serbian footballer of Hungarian ethnicity who was part of Yugoslavia national football team at the 1950 FIFA World Cup. He later became a manager. With FK Partizan he won national championship (1947) and Yugoslav Cup (1947). With Red Star Belgrade he won 2 national championships (1951, 1953) and three Yugoslav Cups (1948, 1949, 1950).

He played with Újvideki AC in the Hungarian championship during the Hungarian occupation in the World War II. He was also part of Yugoslavia's squad for the football tournament at the 1948 Summer Olympics, but he did not play in any matches.

He started his coaching career in Zrenjanin, then he coached FK Sloboda Tuzla in their first seasons in the Yugoslav First League (1959–60 and 1962–63), then he worked in Greece, later took charge of FK Proleter Zrenjanin in the First League in 1969 and also coached Priština. when the club accomplished promotion for the first time to the Yugoslav First League.

References

External links

1923 births
1995 deaths
Sportspeople from Zrenjanin
Hungarians in Vojvodina
Serbian footballers
Yugoslav footballers
Yugoslavia international footballers
Association football midfielders
NAK Novi Sad players
FK Partizan players
Red Star Belgrade footballers
FK Spartak Subotica players
Yugoslav First League players
1950 FIFA World Cup players
Olympic footballers of Yugoslavia
Olympic silver medalists for Yugoslavia
Footballers at the 1948 Summer Olympics
Olympic medalists in football
Yugoslav football managers
Serbian football managers
Aris Thessaloniki F.C. managers
Panachaiki F.C. managers
FC Prishtina managers
FK Radnički 1923 managers
Medalists at the 1948 Summer Olympics